Shane Alexander Thomson (born 27 January 1969) is a former New Zealand international cricketer. He played as a genuine all-rounder, making 19 Test and 56 One Day International appearances for New Zealand.

Thomson was born in Hamilton, Waikato in 1969.

Thomson made his test debut against India in 1990 scoring 42 runs not out in the second innings. He had to wait for another year to play test cricket again, this time against Sri Lanka. He scored 36 and 55 in the second test and scored 80 not out in the second innings of the third test. 

Thomson had some good form on the 1994 tour to South Africa. He top scored with 84 runs for New Zealand in the first test victory over South Africa in Johannesburg. He again top scored for New Zealand in the second test loss to South Africa with 82 runs. Geoff Howarth said of the batting effort in the second test "Shane Thomson's excellent innings apart, the first innings batting display put us under pressure". Ken Rutherford said of the batting: "we were all out for 185 thanks largely to a gutsy 82 by Thomson".

The highlight of his test career was a match winning 120 not out against Pakistan in 1994 In the third test, facing Wasim Akram and Waqar Younis, he shared a 154 run partnership with Bryan Young and hit 15 fours and 2 sixes in the five wicket win.

At the Lords test, on the 1994 tour of England, Thomson scored a useful double of 69 and 38 not out in the drawn match.

Thomson retired from first-class cricket in 1997 at the age of 28, having scored one century and five half-centuries in his 19 test career. "I didn't really retire, I just left the country". He said about his international career: "Playing cricket for New Zealand is tough, so you've got to savour those times when you win". 

He played club cricket for Northern Districts.

Thomson lives in Taupo and works as a property maintenance contractor. He is married and has three children. He has also been involved in  property investment and exporting show jumping horses.

References

1969 births
Living people
Cricketers at the 1996 Cricket World Cup
New Zealand cricketers
New Zealand Test cricketers
New Zealand One Day International cricketers
Northern Districts cricketers
Cricketers from Hamilton, New Zealand
North Island cricketers